Pontus Engblom (born 3 November 1991) is a Swedish professional footballer who plays as a forward for GIF Sundsvall in Superettan.

Engblom has won Allsvenskan, Svenska Cupen and Supercupen in Sweden, and has been the top scorer in the Norwegian First Division three times.

Career statistics

Honours 
AIK
 Allsvenskan: 2009
 Svenska Cupen: 2009
 Supercupen: 2010
Individual
 Norwegian First Division top scorer: 2015, 2016, 2019
 Superettan top scorer: 2020

References

External links 
 

1991 births
Living people
Swedish footballers
Sweden youth international footballers
AIK Fotboll players
AFC Eskilstuna players
GIF Sundsvall players
FK Haugesund players
Sandnes Ulf players
Allsvenskan players
Superettan players
Eliteserien players
People from Sundsvall
Norwegian First Division players
Swedish expatriate footballers
Expatriate footballers in Norway
Swedish expatriate sportspeople in Norway
Association football forwards
Sportspeople from Västernorrland County